Marcin Boguś (born 11 July 1973) is a Polish retired football defender.

References

1973 births
Living people
Polish footballers
Widzew Łódź players
Zagłębie Lubin players
Ceramika Opoczno players
Górnik Łęczna players
KSZO Ostrowiec Świętokrzyski players
Association football defenders
Sportspeople from Łódź